The Indian Ocean Commission (COI) is an intergovernmental organisation that links African Indian Ocean nations: Comoros, Madagascar, Mauritius, Réunion (an overseas region of France), and Seychelles. There are also seven observers: China, the European Union, the Organisation internationale de la Francophonie, the Sovereign Order of Malta, India, Japan and the United Nations.

The IOC was created in 1982 in Port-Louis, Mauritius, and institutionalised in 1984 by the Victoria Agreement (Seychelles).

Historical background 
The IOC was created in 1982 in Port Louis, by the Ministers of Foreign Affairs of Mauritius, Madagascar and Seychelles.

In 1984, the General Cooperation Agreement signed in Victoria (Seychelles) institutionalised the organization.

In 1986, Comoros and France (Réunion Island), joined the organisation.

In 1989, the IOC was provided with a General Secretariat. The headquarters of the IOC is located in Mauritius.

Development 
Since the early 1990s, the IOC has been implementing cooperation projects in environmental management and preservation with the support of the European Union and French cooperation. Over the course of these projects, the IOC has acquired recognised expertise in the management of marine and coastal environments, fisheries and the preservation of biodiversity.

At the beginning of the 2000s, the IOC constantly advocated the specific needs of developing islands, particularly in conferences organised by the United Nations.

In September 2005, the IOC requested observer status at the UN General Assembly.

In 2016, the People's Republic of China becomes the first observer member of the organisation. It is followed in 2017 by the Organisation internationale de la Francophonie, the Sovereign Order of Malta and the European Union.

In 2018, the IOC assumes the chairmanship of the Contact Group on Piracy off the Coast of Somalia (CGPCS) for a period of two years. In 2020, Kenya takes over the chairmanship. However, the IOC continues to serve as the secretariat of the CGPCS.

In 2019, at a ministerial retreat in Moroni (Comoros), the Moroni Declaration on the Future of the IOC is adopted. This text deals with the modernisation of the IOC.

During the 34th Council of Ministers of March 6, 2020 in Seychelles, the Victoria Agreement, the founding text of the IOC, is revised.

In 2020, India, Japan and the United Nations become observer members.

The IOC's project portfolio has expanded considerably: political stability, public health, gender, mobility, entrepreneurship, infrastructure, regional connectivity (digital, air, maritime), trade negotiations, maritime security, food security and agricultural development, fisheries and fisheries surveillance, climate change mitigation, sustainable coastal zone management, waste management, use of earth observation technologies for environmental monitoring, renewable energy, culture, etc.

The IOC has a dozen technical and financial partners, among which the European Union and the French Development Agency.

Members

Member States

Observing members

Administration 
The IOC is at the service of its Member States.

Bodies 
The Council of Ministers (composed of the foreign ministers of the member countries) provides the strategic and political direction of the IOC. It is the supreme decision-making body of the organisation. The chairmanship of the IOC Council of Ministers is annual and rotating (in alphabetical order of member countries).

The Committee of Permanent Liaison Officers (composed of senior officials from member states) is responsible for monitoring the implementation of these decisions.

The General Secretariat, based in Ebene, Mauritius, is responsible for implementing the decisions of the decision-making bodies. It develops and manages cooperation projects. It is responsible for mobilizing resources from the donor community.

The revised Victoria Agreement (2020) makes the Summit of Heads of State and Government a statutory body of the organisation. The IOC Summit will now be held every five years to set the strategic and political direction of the organisation.

Secretaries-General

Objectives and areas of intervention 
As an intergovernmental organisation of cooperation, the Indian Ocean Commission promotes peace and stability, maritime security, food security, environmental conservation, fisheries, climate change adaptation, the interests of island developing states, public health and cultural expression.

Its action is thus in line with the international frameworks to which its member states are signatories, such as the Global Agenda for Sustainable Development to 2030 and the Global Climate Agreement, among others.

In 2020, the IOC is implementing 14 cooperation projects. Over the period 2020–2025, it will manage a total project budget of approximately 130 million euros.

References

External links
 
 World Bank Regional Institutions

Indian Ocean
Intergovernmental organizations
Organizations established in 1982
United Nations General Assembly observers
1982 establishments in Mauritius